Jan Jeřábek may refer to

 Jan Jeřábek (footballer born 1984), Czech footballer
 Jan Jeřábek (footballer born 1992), Czech footballer